Abbie an' Slats is an American comic strip which ran from July 12, 1937, to January 30, 1971, initially written by Al Capp and drawn by Raeburn Van Buren. It was distributed by United Feature Syndicate.

Publication history 
Abbie an' Slats was Capp's idea; he intended to start a second strip after the success of his popular Li'l Abner. Instead of drawing it himself, Capp recruited well-established freelance magazine illustrator Van Buren. Initially, Van Buren turned down Capp's offer, but he was lured by the prospect of steady work.

The strip was widely syndicated to 400 newspapers, but it never equalled the popularity of Li'l Abner. Capp abandoned the strip in 1945, turning the writing chores over to his brother Elliot Caplin.

Taking on Andy Sprague as an assistant in 1947, Van Buren continued to draw the strip, and it ended with his retirement in 1971.

Van Buren continued Abbie an' Slats for 34 years, retiring in 1971. The National Cartoonists Society named him to their Hall of Fame in 1979.

Characters and story
In 1937, the story began with stubborn, street-wise Aubrey Eustace Scrapple, aka Slats, recently orphaned in New York. Arriving by train in a small town of Crabtree Corners, where he was met by his older cousin, the spinster Abigail Scrapple, aka Abbie. Slats joined the household that also included Abbie's sister, the prim and proper Sally.

Slats made an enemy of skinflint Jasper Hagstone when he drove into Hagstone's limousine while trying to avoid running over a dog. However, Hagstone's daughter, Judy, became the object of Slats' affection. Later, Becky Groggins became Slats' sweetheart. Becky's father, J. Pierpont "Bathless" Groggins, eventually became the central character of the Sunday strip.

Archives
Van Buren's work from 1954 to 1968 (160 items) is kept at the Syracuse University Library's Special Collections Research Center.

Raeburn Van Buren and Abigail Van Buren 
In 1984, Van Buren sent a gift to "Dear Abby" columnist Abigail Van Buren (Pauline Phillips). She wrote back on November 30, 1984, thanking him and then commented on the name similarity:

Reprints
Most books collecting vintage comic strips suffer a loss in reproduction because clippings from newspapers are the usual source, but two Abbie an' Slats books displayed a higher quality because they were compiled from original proof sheets by publisher Ken Pierce.

References

External links
Raeburn Van Buren Cartoons at Syracuse University Library

American comic strips
1937 comics debuts
1971 comics endings
Comic strip duos
American comics characters
Characters created by Al Capp
Humor comics
Adventure comics
Comics characters introduced in 1937
Al Capp
Male characters in comics